Ceratozamia chimalapensis is a species of cycad in the family Zamiaceae. It is found in the extreme western portion of the Sierra Madre de Chiapas massif (also known as the Sierra Atravesada).

References

Whitelock, Loran M. 2002. The Cycads. Portland: Timber Press.

External links
 * 

chimalapensis
Flora of Mexico
Plants described in 2008